Dusk Till Dawn Poker Club is a cardroom in Nottingham, England, located in the Boulevard Retail Park on the edge of the city. The club opened in the year 2007 and is owned by Rob Yong.

History
Rob Yong is an avid poker player. In 2006, Yong and his friend Nick Whiten were turned away from a poker tournament at their local casino after arriving one minute too late. Yong decided to open his own casino. Professional poker player, Sam Trickett, was at the cardroom on opening night. He described it as a "place specifically for people to play poker".

In 2007, Yong opened Dusk Till Dawn as a casino focused on low stakes and recreational poker players. The casino helped the growth of the game in Nottingham.

Cardroom
The cardroom currently has 45 poker tables and offers automatic roulette and slots, having ceased offering table games in 2019. In 2015, partypoker partnered with Dusk Till Dawn and later hosted "The party poker Grand Prix".

In 2017, the casino hosted the partypoker LIVE MILLIONS Dusk Till Dawn festival. The £5,300 main event generated a prize pool of £6,017,395. Maria Lampropulos won the main event, earning £1,000,000. The £10,300 High Roller game was won by Vojtech Ruzicka, earning him US$363,135.

See also
 List of casinos

References

External links

Casinos in England